Deltha Lee O'Neal, III (born January 30, 1977) is a former American college and professional football player who was a cornerback in the National Football League (NFL) for nine seasons.  He played college football for the University of California, Berkeley, and was recognized as a consensus All-American.  He was drafted by the Denver Broncos as the 15th pick overall in the 2000 NFL Draft, and he played professionally for the Broncos, Cincinnati Bengals and New England Patriots of the NFL.  He was a two-time Pro Bowl selection.

Early years
O'Neal was born in Palo Alto, California.  He is a 1995 graduate of Milpitas High School in Milpitas, California, where he was a running back, cornerback, and kick returner for the Milpitas high school football team. In track & field, he was a state-qualifier in the 100 and 200-meters, with personal-bests of 10.75 in the 100 and 21.66 in the 200. He was also a member of the 4 × 100 m (41.65s) relay squad.

College career
He attended the University of California, Berkeley, and played for the California Golden Bears football team.  In his senior year with the Golden Bears, O'Neal set the NCAA single-season record of four interceptions returned for touchdowns and was recognized as a consensus first-team All-American.  He graduated from California with a degree in social welfare in 2000.

Professional career

Denver Broncos
O'Neal was originally drafted by the Denver Broncos in the first round of the 2000 NFL Draft.

Due to O'Neal's speed, former Broncos head coach Mike Shanahan briefly flirted with converting O'Neal to wide receiver in mid-2003. O'Neal had two receptions, for four yards, in two games. O'Neal was also used frequently to return punts and kickoffs on special teams. While with the Broncos, O'Neal tied the record for most interceptions in a game with four.

Cincinnati Bengals
In April 2004, an unhappy O'Neal and the Broncos' 24th (first round) and 117th (fourth round) spots in the 2004 NFL draft were traded to the Cincinnati Bengals in exchange for Cincinnati's 17th spot in the first round.

In the 2005 season, O'Neal recorded ten interceptions, breaking the franchise record of nine, set by Ken Riley in 1976 and equalling Ty Law as the NFL's interception leader that year. He broke the record on December 18, 2005, against the Detroit Lions.

In early December 2006, O'Neal was arrested on DWI charges. In the 2007 season, O'Neal recorded 52 tackles and one interception.

O'Neal was released by the Bengals on August 30, 2008.

New England Patriots
On September 1, 2008, O'Neal was signed by the New England Patriots.

Houston Texans
O'Neal signed with the Houston Texans on August 6, 2009 following an injury to cornerback Jacques Reeves. He was released on September 5, 2009.

NFL statistics

Legal issues
On December 9, 2006, O'Neal was arrested in the Pierce Twp community of Cincinnati after he was pulled over for driving while intoxicated.  O'Neal was driving a black Cadillac Escalade.  He was one of 9 Bengals players arrested during the 2006 offseason and regular season.

In December 2019, O'Neal was charged with one count of DUI with serious injury and one of DUI with property damage in Royal Palm Beach, Florida after speeding 100 mph in his Mercedes Benz and striking a utility pole, causing the vehicle to catch fire on August 7, 2019. He and a passenger were airlifted to St. Mary's Medical Center, where O'Neal suffered a broken ankle, a fractured back and neck, an eye injury, brain bleeding and intestinal injuries.

References

External links
Houston Texans bio
New England Patriots bio

1977 births
Living people
All-American college football players
American Conference Pro Bowl players
American football cornerbacks
American football return specialists
California Golden Bears football players
Cincinnati Bengals players
Denver Broncos players
Houston Texans players
New England Patriots players
Sportspeople from Palo Alto, California
Players of American football from California
People from Milpitas, California